NGC 6723 is a globular cluster  in the constellation Sagittarius. Its magnitude is given as between 6 and 6.8, and its diameter is between 7 and 11 arcminutes. It is a class VII cluster with stars of magnitude 14 and dimmer. It is near the border of Sagittarius and Corona Australis.

Unlike common globular clusters, NGC 6723 has an enhanced metallicity and a large fraction of younger stars, with primordial stars accounting for only 0.363 % of the total.

References

 Robert Burnham Jr, Burnham's Celestial Handbook: An observer's guide to the universe beyond the solar system, vol 3, p. 1558

External links
 
 
 NGC 6723

Globular clusters
Sagittarius (constellation)
6723